Reborn Dogs is the sixth studio album by German thrash metal band Holy Moses, released in 1992. The album was re-issued on 1 March 2006.

Track listing
 "Clash My Soul" - 2:26
 "Decapitated Mind" - 3:31
 "Welcome to the Real World" - 3:32
 "Reborn Dogs" - 3:45
 "Fuck You" - 3:24
 "Third Birth" - 3:10
 "Deadicate" - 4:10
 "The Five Year Plan (D.R.I. Cover)" - 3:46
 "Process of Pain" - 2:59
 "Reverse" - 3:08
 "Dancing with the Dead" - 5:21

Personnel
Sabina Classen - vocals
Andy Classen - guitar
Benny Schnell - bass
Sven Herwig - drums

References

Holy Moses albums
1992 albums
Albums produced by Andy Classen